SS George W. Elder (1874–1935) was a passenger/cargo ship. Originally a U.S. east coast steamer, she was built by John Roach & Sons in Chester, Pennsylvania. The George W. Elder became a west coast steamer in 1876 and served with the Oregon Steamship Company, Oregon Railroad and Navigation Company, San Francisco and Portland Steamship Company and the North Pacific Steamship Company. In 1907, the George W. Elder helped to rescue the survivors of her former running mate Columbia. The last owners of the George W. Elder were a Chilean firm which operated her under the name America. She operated the Chilean Coast under this guise until 1935, when she was finally scrapped. The location of her scrapping remains unknown.

History
The George W. Elder was launched in 1874 at the Delaware River Iron Ship Building and Engine Works of John Roach & Sons in Chester, Pennsylvania and first served as a nightboat for the Old Dominion Steamship Company on the New York City to Chesapeake Bay route. Due to her design, the George W. Elder was able to visit several different ports.

In 1876, the George W. Elder was sold to the Oregon Steamship Company, which brought the ship around Cape Horn and placed her on the San Francisco, California to Portland, Oregon route. The George W. Elder became part of the Oregon Railroad and Navigation Company fleet after O.R. & N purchased the Oregon Steamship Company. In O.R. & N service, the George W. Elder served alongside the innovative Columbia, which was the first structure to use the incandescent light bulb outside Thomas Edison's laboratory in Menlo Park, New Jersey. O.R. & N was bought out by the Union Pacific Railroad in 1898.

On May 31, 1899, the George W. Elder set out of Seattle, Washington on a scientific exploration voyage to Russia, via British Columbia and Alaska. Although her stopovers were brief, the actions and nature of research done on the George W. Elder followed tradition. The George W. Elder was captained by Peter A. Doran during this expedition.

After the Harriman Expedition, the United States Army drafted the George W. Elder in November 1899 for use as a troopship in the Philippines during the Spanish–American War. Strangely during this time, the owners of the George W. Elder were listed as Goodall, Perkins & Company, the agents of the Pacific Coast Steamship Company who were the owners of the ill-fated Pacific back in 1875. In December of the same year, she was returned to O.R. & N.

In 1904, the George W. Elder was transferred to the newly formed San Francisco and Portland Steamship Company along with the Columbia. During this time, the George W. Elder continued to build on its reputation for being a safe vessel. In 1905 however, this reputation vanished, when the George W. Elder, now 31 years old, struck a rock along the Columbia River and sank under  of water. She was raised in May, 1906. After being salvaged, the San Francisco and Portland Steamship Company abandoned her and she was sold in Auction to Captain J.H. Peterson. In 1906, the George W. Elder was sold to the North Pacific Steamship Company, who would be her last American owners. In a chance of coincidence, the George W. Elder was paired the SS Roanoke, which had also been built as a nightboat for the Old Dominion Steamship Company.

On July 21, 1907, the former running mate to the George W. Elder, the Columbia collided with the lumber schooner San Pedro off Shelter Cove, California, causing the Columbia to sink, killing 88 people. Among the dead was Captain Peter A. Doran, who had commanded the George W. Elder on her 1899 Harriman Expedition. Both the George W. Elder and Roanoke arrived at the site of the disaster and picked up Columbias survivors from the badly damaged San Pedro. The George W. Elder returned some of the survivors to Astoria, Oregon. The George W. Elder also towed the San Pedro to shore, following the disaster.

By 1915, the North Pacific Steamship Company was struggling, due to the loss of their steamer Santa Clara on the bar of Coos Bay, Oregon, in 1914. The management considered closing the company's doors. Thankfully, relief came when the California South Seas Navigation Company chartered both Roanoke and George W. Elder. Neither were used for passenger service under this charter. Unfortunately, the Roanoke capsized and sank off the California coastline, on her second voyage under the charter. Only three people survived. During World War I, the George W. Elder was leased by the Pacific Mail Steamship Company, which was at the time owned by the Grace Line. The George W. Elder was used during this time as part of a four ship feeder service for Central American and Mexican ports.

At war's end, now 44 years old, the George W. Elder was sold to Artigas Riolrio Compania, based in Valparaiso, Chile, they were to be her last operators. The George W. Elder was renamed America and served the Chilean coastline until 1935. On 7 December 1928, the Chilean cargo ship  collided with America and sank.

America survived the collision and was reported scrapped in 1935, but it remains uncertain whether the job was done in Japan or Valparaiso. Either way, America had reached an outstanding age of 61 years.

See also

References

External links
 Kelley House Museum Archives – Search results for George Elder – Includes many photographs of the George W. Elder.
 Photograph of the George W. Elder – Dated circa 1898. This photograph however, shows the ship partially sunk, suggesting that this may be after her 1905 sinking.

Steamships of the United States
Maritime incidents in 1905
Shipwrecks in rivers
Maritime incidents in 1928
1874 ships
Passenger ships of the United States
Ships built by the Delaware River Iron Ship Building and Engine Works
Spanish–American War auxiliary ships of the United States